Siwi may refer to:
the Siwi people
the Siwi language
Siwi, Burkina Faso
SIWI, Stockholm International Water Institute
Another spelling for Sibi, Pakistan